Daniel Hocine Guicci (or Guici; 27 December 1943 – 31 March 2016) was a French professional footballer who played as a centre-back.

Club career 
Guicci began his career at Valenciennes. He made 21 appearances for the club in all competitions before signing for newly-formed Paris Saint-Germain (PSG) in 1970. 

On 24 January 1971, Guicci was involved in an altercation with  during a match between Caen and PSG. Marcel Bacou, the referee, handed a red card to Guicci; this was a first in the history of Paris Saint-Germain. Guicci left PSG in 1972 after having made a total of 25 appearances for the club. He joined the newly re-formed Paris FC, and ended his career there two years later.

International career 
Guicci was an amateur international for France.

Career statistics

Honours 
Paris Saint-Germain
 Division 2: 1970–71

References

External links 
 

1943 births
2016 deaths
French footballers
Footballers from Paris
Association football defenders
Valenciennes FC players
Paris Saint-Germain F.C. players
Paris FC players
Ligue 1 players
Ligue 2 players
France amateur international footballers